The 2016 Royal Bank Cup was the 46th Canadian junior A Ice Hockey National Championship for the Canadian Junior Hockey League. It was the 46th consecutive year a national championship was awarded to this skill level since the breakaway of Major Junior hockey in 1970. Hockey Canada junior hockey council chairman Brent Ladds served as chairman of the 2016 Royal Bank Cup organizing committee.

Teams
Lloydminster Bobcats (Host)
Regular Season: 44-14-2 (3rd AJHL North Division)
Playoffs: Defeated Drayton Valley (3-0), Defeated Whitecourt (4-0), Defeated by Spruce Grove (4-1).
West Kelowna Warriors (Western #1)
Regular Season: 38-17-2-1 (2nd BCHL Interior Division)
Playoffs: Defeated Salmon Arm (4-2), Defeated Penticton (4-2), Finished 2nd BCHL Round 3 (3-3), Defeated Chilliwack (4-2), Won Western Canada Cup (4-1)
Brooks Bandits (Western #2)
Regular Season: 49-9-2 (1st AJHL South Division)
Playoffs: Defeated Canmore (4-0), Defeated Camrose (4-0), Defeated Spruce Grove (4-1), Finished 2nd at Western Canada Cup (5-1)
Trenton Golden Hawks (Central)
Regular Season: 44-6-1-3 (1st OJHL East Division)
Playoffs: Defeated Newmarket (4-0), Defeated Wellington (4-1), Defeated Kingston (4-0), Defeated Georgetown (4-1), Won Dudley Hewitt Cup (4-0)
Carleton Place Canadians (Eastern)
Regular Season: 43-16-2-1 (1st CCHL Robinson Division)
Playoffs: Defeated Pembroke (4-1), Defeated Brockville (4-0), Defeated Ottawa (4-3), Won Fred Page Cup (4-0)

Tournament

Round Robin

Schedule and results 

All games played in Lloydminster, SK.

Semifinal Results

Final results

Awards
Roland Mercier Trophy (Tournament MVP): Cale Makar, Brooks
Top Forward: Bryce Van Horn, Carleton Place
Top Defencemen: Cale Makar, Brooks
Top Goaltender: Daniel Urbani, Trenton
Tubby Schmalz Trophy (Sportsmanship): Christian Lloyd, Lloydminster
Top Scorer: Cale Makar, Brooks

Roll of League Champions
AJHL: Brooks Bandits
BCHL: West Kelowna Warriors
CCHL: Carleton Place Canadians
MHL: Pictou County Crushers
MJHL: Portage Terriers
NOJHL: Soo Thunderbirds
OJHL: Trenton Golden Hawks
QJHL: Longueuil Collège Français
SJHL: Melfort Mustangs
SIJHL: Fort Frances Lakers

References

External links
2016 Royal Bank Cup

Royal Bank Cup 2016
Canadian Junior Hockey League national championships
Ice hockey competitions in Saskatchewan 
Sport in Lloydminster
2016 in Saskatchewan